Events in the year 2018 in Mongolia.

Incumbents
President: Khaltmaagiin Battulga
Prime Minister: Ukhnaagiin Khürelsükh

Events

Sports 
9 to 25 February – Mongolia participated at the 2018 Winter Olympics in PyeongChang, South Korea, with 2 competitors in 1 sport (cross-country skiing).

Deaths

9 April – Jigjidiin Mönkhbat, wrestler, Olympic silver medalist (1968) (b. 1941).

References

 
2010s in Mongolia 
Years of the 21st century in Mongolia 
Mongolia 
Mongolia